Dematioscypha is a genus of fungi within the Hyaloscyphaceae family. The genus contains 3 species.

References

External links
Dematioscypha at Index Fungorum

Hyaloscyphaceae